Dominik Bíró (born 25 June 1998) is a Hungarian professional footballer who plays for Kaposvár.

Club statistics

Updated to games played as of 30 October 2019.

References

1998 births
Living people
People from Szekszárd
Hungarian footballers
Association football forwards
Nyírbátori FC players
Kaposvári Rákóczi FC players
Nemzeti Bajnokság I players
Nemzeti Bajnokság II players
Nemzeti Bajnokság III players
Sportspeople from Tolna County